Kubdari or Kubed (Svan: კუბედ) is a Georgian filled bread dish which is particularly a national dish of the Svans. The bread is leavened and allowed to rise. The filling contains chunks of meat, which can be lamb, kid or pork, Georgian spices and onions.  Kubdari was inscribed on the Intangible Cultural Heritage of Georgia list in 2015.

See also
 List of bread dishes

References

Cuisine of Georgia (country)
Bread dishes